Annasaheb Shinde (21 January 1922 – 12 January 1993) was member of 3rd and 4th Lok Sabha from Kopargaon (Lok Sabha constituency) in Maharashtra state, India.

He was elected to 5th, and 6th Lok Sabha from Ahmednagar (Lok Sabha constituency).
Union Deputy Minister for Food, Agriculture, Community Development and Co-operation, 1966–67;
Minister of State in the Ministry of Food, Agriculture, Community Development and Co-operation, 1967–74;
Minister of State in the Ministry of Food, Agriculture, and Irrigation, 1974–77.

References

1922 births
1993 deaths
People from Nashik district
India MPs 1962–1967
India MPs 1967–1970
India MPs 1971–1977
India MPs 1977–1979
People from Ahmednagar district
Maharashtra politicians
Lok Sabha members from Maharashtra
Indian National Congress politicians from Maharashtra